Rolf Presthus (29 July 1936 – 1 January 1988) was a Norwegian politician and lawyer, who was chairman of the Norwegian Conservative Party from 1986 to 1988.

Presthus served as Minister of Finance 1981–1986, and Minister of Defence in 1986. He was a member of parliament from Akershus from 1969 to 1988, and mayor of Oppegård from 1968 to 1969.

At the Conservative party conference in 1987 he became the first Norwegian politician to use a teleprompter during a speech. He received widespread criticism and accusations, both for cheating and contributing to the Americanization of Norwegian politics.

Presthus died in Oslo at the age of 51 on 1 January 1988, due to a cerebral hemorrhage.

References 

1936 births
1988 deaths
Members of the Storting
Ministers of Finance of Norway
Leaders of the Conservative Party (Norway)
20th-century Norwegian politicians
Defence ministers of Norway